Frost and Fire may refer to:

"Frost and Fire" (short story), a short story by Ray Bradbury
Frost and Fire (album), an album by the heavy metal band Cirith Ungol
Frost and Fire, the 1965 album by The Watersons
Frost & Fire, a collection of short stories and essays by Roger Zelazny
"Frost & Fire", the thirtieth episode of the fifth season of Adventure Time